Bactris setiflora is a species of palm tree. It is endemic to Ecuador, where it is known only from Pastaza Province. It is threatened by deforestation.

References

setiflora
Endemic flora of Ecuador
Endangered plants
Taxonomy articles created by Polbot
Taxa named by Max Burret